Oddar Meanchey (UNGEGN: Ŏttâr Méanchoăy, ALA-LC: Uttar Mānjăy) is a province  of Cambodia in the remote northwest. It borders the provinces of Banteay Meanchey to the west, Siem Reap to the south and Preah Vihear to the east. Its long northern boundary demarcates part of Cambodia's international border with Thailand. The capital is Samraong.

The province was created on 27 April 1999, after being carved from the northern half of Siem Reap province and part of Banteay Meanchey. It existed as a province already from 1962 to 1970 under Norodom Sihanouk's Sangkum regime, but later became an administrative no-man's-land, with its status alternating between a province and a district under successive regimes.

Etymology
Oddar Meanchey means 'victorious North'. The province's name is of Sanskrit origin through Pali and is derived from the words uttarā (उत्तर), meaning 'north', and jaya (जय) which means 'victory'.  Khmer Mean (មាន) means 'to have'.

Administrative divisions
The province is subdivided into 1 municipality (krong) and 4 districts (srok), and further subdivided into 19 communes (khum) and 5 quarters (sangkat).

Ecology
This province is in the Dângrêk Mountains. There is a serious problem of deforestation in the area. However, the first community-based mosaic REDD+ project in Asia was awarded Verified Carbon Standard and Climate, Community and Biodiversity Standard validation for its forest conservation work in the province.

Forest fires are common in the dry forest and there is much illegal logging as a result of economic land concessions and migrant forest encroachment.

History

 
The mountainous and forested area that now makes up Oddar Meanchey province was part of Siamese province of Monthon Isan from 1795 to 1907 under the supervision of Sangkha. After the neighboring Thai province of Inner Cambodia, and Oddar Meanchey, was returned to Cambodia in 1907, King Sisowath split the province into Battambang and Siem Reap (Oddar Meanchey was included with Siem Reap). Following the Franco-Thai War from 1941 to 1946 the province was under Siamese administration as Phibunsongkhram province. The province was returned to Cambodian rule in 1946 following French diplomatic efforts at the end of World War II. The province was officially organized in 1966. During the Cambodian Civil War, the remote area was used as a base by the Khmer Rouge when they fought against the Khmer Republic led by general Lon Nol.

The Khmer Rouge rebuilt their former bases in the Dangrek mountain range area, along the border with Thailand and made Anlong Veng their base from 1989 till 1997. Oddar Meanchey province is one of the most landmine-ridden areas in Cambodia.

References 

 
Provinces of Cambodia
States and territories established in 1964
States and territories established in 1995